The Halesowen News is a local free newspaper serving the Halesowen area of the West Midlands, England. It circulates in the town of Halesowen and its surrounding communities, as well as the neighbouring area of Rowley Regis. It has been in circulation since February 1985.

References

Halesowen
Newspapers published in the West Midlands (county)
Newspapers published by Newsquest